Dhar Tichitt is a Neolithic archaeological site located in the southwestern region of the Sahara Desert, in Mauritania. It is one of several settlement locations along the sandstone cliffs in the area. Dhar Tichitt, Dhar Walata, Dhar Néma, and Dhar Tagant are the sites which compose Tichitt culture. The cliffs were inhabited by farmers and pastoralists starting at around 4500 BP and lasted to around 2300 BP, or approximately 2500 to 500 BCE. This area is one of the oldest known archaeological occupation sites in the western part of Africa. About 500 stone settlements littered the region in the former savannah of the Sahara. In addition to herding livestock (e.g., cattle, sheep, goats), its inhabitants hunted, fished, collected wild grain, and grew bulrush millet. The inhabitants and creators of these settlements during these periods thought to have been ancestors of the Soninke people.

Geography
The climate of the Dhar Tichitt region today is very arid and hot. However, this was not always the case. The area was much more temperate during a humid phase referred to as the Nouakchottian, c. 5000-3000 BP. During this time, the region experienced two different seasons per year, a dry season and a shorter rainy season. Around 2500 BP, the climate began to change, and it became too dry for people to stay in the area.

Archaeology
This site is considered a Neolithic site. The Neolithic period in Africa (sometimes referred to as the Pastoral Neolithic) is marked by a change from hunter-gatherer lifestyles towards agricultural or pastoralist ones. The Dhar Tichitt region was inhabited by pastoralists around 4500 BP. Though occupied yearly, some areas were used during the rainy season, and others were used in the dry season. During the rainy season, occupation would have centered on the plateau, where there are heavy dry-stone masonry structures. During the dry season, settlements would have been at smaller, more temporary camps in the lowlands, where there would be available water. Plateau settlements consisted of multiple of stone-walled compounds containing houses and granaries/"storage facilities", sometimes with street layouts. Large livestock enclosures were erected in proximity of some sites. And around some settlements, larger stone common "circumvallation walls" were built, suggesting that "special purpose groups" cooperated as a result of decisions "enforced for the benefit of the community as a whole."  Sites of these types have been excavated and analyzed by archaeologist Augustin Holl; for example, Site 38 is on the plateau, and Site 46 is found in a sandy lowland depression. 

The faunal evidence at the Dhar Tichitt area is highly diverse and this is not surprising given the history of the area. Cattle, sheep, and goats are the most common faunal remains at Site 36 with these also accounting for the majority of the faunal remains found at the site in general. Other faunal remains at these sites include crocodile, hippopotamus, ostrich, gazelle, fish, and very few representative bones of other animals. Given the amount of faunal remains that are from domesticated animals it is safe to say that this was a pastoralist society.

The botanical remains at the site reveal that not only were the people here pastoralists but that they also had some cultivation skills. Pennisetum or bulrush millet is the only domesticate found at this site, and was most commonly cultivated during the rainy season at upland settlements. During the dry season, wild grains and fruits were collected in the lowlands to supplement the otherwise pastoralist diet.

The Dhar Tichitt site had become a complex culture by 3600 BP and had architectural and material culture elements that seemed to match the site at Koumbi Saleh. In more recent work in Dhar Tichitt, and then in Dhar Nema and Dhar Walata, it has become more and more clear that as the desert advanced, the Dhar Tichitt culture (which had abandoned its earliest site around 2300 BP, possibly because of pressure from desert nomads, but also because of increasing aridity) and moved southward into the still well-watered areas of northern Mali.

References

Archaeological sites in Mauritania
Archaeological sites of Western Africa
Populated places established in the 3rd millennium BC